Phokion J. Tanos (1898 – 9 February 1972), also known as Phocion Jean Tano, Phoqué J. Tano, Phokion J. Tano, was a Cypriot dealer of antiques in Cairo, who was involved in the sale of papyri belonging to the Nag Hammadi library.

References

Further reading 

 James M. Robinson: The Facsimile Edition of the Nag Hammadi Codices: Supplement, Leiden 1984, 
 James M. Robinson: The Nag Hammadi Story from the Discovery to the Publication, Nag Hammadi and Manichaean Studies 86, Leiden ; Boston 2014, 
 Brent Nongbri: God’s Library: The Archaeology of the Earliest Christian Manuscripts, New Haven 2018,

External links 

 The Gnostic Discoveries: The Impact of the Nag Hammadi Library
 Nag Hammadi Archive

1898 births
1972 deaths